Harry Gordon Frankfurt (born May 29, 1929) is an American philosopher. He is professor emeritus of philosophy at Princeton University, where he taught from 1990 until 2002. Frankfurt has also taught at Yale University, Rockefeller University, and Ohio State University.

Frankfurt has made significant contributions to fields like ethics and philosophy of mind. The attitude of caring plays a central role in his philosophy. To care about something means to see it as important and reflects the person's character. According to Frankfurt, a person is someone who has second-order volitions or who cares about what desires they have. He contrasts persons with wantons. Wantons are beings that have desires but do not care about which of their desires is translated into action. In the field of ethics, Frankfurt has given various influential counterexamples, so-called Frankfurt cases, against the principle that moral responsibility depends on the ability to do otherwise. His most popular book is On Bullshit, which discusses, among other things, the distinction between bullshitting and lying.

Biography

Early life
Frankfurt was born on May 29, 1929, in Langhorne, Pennsylvania. He obtained his B.A. in 1949 and Ph.D. in 1954 from Johns Hopkins University.

Career
He is professor emeritus of philosophy at Princeton University.

He taught at Ohio State University (1956—1962), SUNY Binghamton (1962—1963), Rockefeller University (from 1963 until the philosophy department was closed in 1976), Yale University (from 1976, where he served as chair of the philosophy department 1978—1987), and then Princeton (1990—2002).

His major areas of interest include moral philosophy, philosophy of mind and action, and 17th-century rationalism. His 1986 paper On Bullshit, a philosophical investigation of the concept of "bullshit", was republished as a book in 2005 and became a surprise bestseller, leading to media appearances such as Jon Stewart's The Daily Show. In this work he explains how bullshitting is different from lying, in that it is an act that has no regard for the truth. He argues that “It is impossible for someone to lie unless he thinks he knows the truth. Producing bullshit requires no such conviction.” In 2006 he released a companion book, On Truth, which explores society's loss of appreciation for truth.

Among philosophers, he was for a time best known for his interpretation of Descartes's rationalism.  His most influential work, however, has been on freedom of the will (on which he has written numerous important papers) based on his concept of higher-order volitions and for developing what are known as "Frankfurt cases" or "Frankfurt counterexamples" (i.e., thought experiments designed to show the possibility of situations in which a person could not have done other than he/she did, but in which our intuition is to say nonetheless that this feature of the situation does not prevent that person from being morally responsible).  Frankfurt is probably the leading living Humean compatibilist, developing Hume's view that to be free is to do what one wants to do.  (Others who develop this view are David Velleman, Gary Watson and John Martin Fischer.)  Frankfurt's version of compatibilism is  the subject of a substantial literature by other philosophy professors.  More recently, he has written on love and caring.

He is a Fellow of the American Academy of Arts and Sciences. He has been a Visiting Fellow of All Souls College, Oxford University; he served as President, Eastern Division, American Philosophical Association; and he has received fellowships and grants from the Guggenheim Foundation, the National Endowment for the Humanities, and the Andrew Mellon Foundation.

Philosophy

Caring and importance 
According to Frankfurt, a lot of the philosophical discourse concerns either the domain of epistemology, which asks what we should believe, or ethics, which asks how we should act. He argues that there is another branch of inquiry that has received less attention, namely the question of what has importance or what we should care about. An agent cares about something if they have a certain attitude of the will: they see the entity in question as important to them. For Frankfurt, what we care about reflects our personal character or who we are. This also affects the person on the practical level concerning how they act and lead their life.

In the academic literature, caring is often understood as a subjective attitude in contrast to importance as an objective factor. On this view, the importance of something determines whether it is appropriate to care about it: people should care about important things but not about unimportant ones. Frankfurt defends a different perspective on this issue by arguing that caring about something makes this thing important. So when a person starts caring about something, this thing becomes important to them even if it was unimportant to them before. Frankfurt explains this in terms of needs: the caring attitude brings with it a need. Because of this need, the cared-for thing can affect the person's well-being and has thereby become important to them. Yitzhak Benbaji terms this relation between caring and importance "Frankfurt's Care-Importance Principle". He rejects it based on the claim that at least some cases of the caring attitude are misguided. This usually involves situations in which the agent has a wrong belief that the object of their caring would affect their well-being. In one example, the agent follows a charlatan's health advice to avoid a certain type of food. Benbaji argues that this constitutes a counterexample since the person cares about avoiding this food even though it has no impact on their health or their well-being.

Personhood 
Persons are characterized by certain attributes or capacities, like reason, moral responsibility, and self-consciousness. However, there is wide disagreement, both within the academic discourse and between different cultures about what the essential features of personhood are. One influential and precisely formulated account of personhood is given by Frankfurt in his "Freedom of the Will and the Concept of a Person". He holds that persons are beings that have second-order volitions. A volition is an effective desire, i.e. a desire that the agent is committed to realizing. Not all desires become volitions: humans usually have many desires but put only some of them into action. For example, the agent may have one desire to eat an unhealthy cake but follows their other desire to have a healthy salad instead. In this case, eating the cake is a mere desire while eating the salad is a volition. Frankfurt places great importance on the difference between first- and second-order desires. Most regular desires, like the desire to eat healthy food or to buy a car, are first-order desires. Second-order desires are desires about desires. So the desire to have a desire to eat healthy food is a second-order desire. Entities with first-order desires care about what the world around them is like, for example, whether they own a car or not. Entities with second-order desires care also about themselves, i.e. what they themselves are like and what mental states they possess. A second-order desire becomes a second-order volition if it is effective, i.e. if the agent is committed to realizing it by fostering the corresponding first-order desire. Frankfurt sees this as the mark of personhood since entities with second-order volitions do not just have desires but also care about which desires they have. So persons are committed to the desires they have.
 
According to Frankfurt, not every entity with a mind is a person. He refers to such entities as "wantons". Wantons have desires and follow them but do not care about their own will. In this regard, they are indifferent to which of their desires become effective and are translated into action. Frankfurt holds that personhood is an important feature of humans but not of other animals. However, even some humans may be wantons at times. Various of Frankfurt's examples of such cases involve some forms of akrasia in which a person acts according to a first-order desire that they do not want to have on the second order. For example, a struggling drug addict may follow their first-order desire to take drugs even though they have a second-order desire to stop wanting drugs.

Moral responsibility and principle of alternative possibilities 
The term "moral responsibility" refers to the forward-looking moral obligation to perform certain actions and to the backward-looking status of being worthy of blame or praise for having done something or having failed to do so. An important principle in this regard is the principle of alternative possibilities. It states that "a person is morally responsible for what she has done only if she could have done otherwise". Having this ability to do otherwise is usually associated with having free will. So under normal circumstances, a person is morally responsible for stealing someone's lunch at the cafeteria. However, this may not be the case under special circumstances, for example, if a neurological disorder compelled them to do it. Frankfurt has rejected the principle of alternative possibilities based on a series of counterexamples, the so-called "Frankfurt cases". In one example, Allison's father has implanted a computer chip in Allison's head without her knowing. This chip would force Allison to walk her dog. However, Allison freely decides to do so and the chip is thus not activated. Frankfurt argues that, in this case, Allison is morally responsible for walking her dog even though she lacked the ability to do otherwise. The crux of this and similar cases is that the agent is morally responsible because they acted in accordance with their own will. This is so despite the fact that, usually unbeknownst to the agent, there was no real alternative. This line of thought has led Frankfurt to advocate a form of compatibilism: if free will and moral responsibility do not depend on the ability to do otherwise then they could even exist in a fully deterministic world. Frankfurt cases have provoked a significant discussion of the principle of alternative possibilities. However, not everyone agrees that they are successful at disproving it.

Bibliography

Interviews
 'The Necessity of Love' in Alex Voorhoeve Conversations on Ethics. Oxford University Press, 2009.  (A discussion of his views on moral responsibility, caring and love, and the relationship of his later work on the structure of the will to his earlier work on Descartes.)

See also
American philosophy
List of American philosophers

Notes

References
Bischof, Michael H. (2004). Kann ein Konzept der Willensfreiheit auf das Prinzip der alternativen Möglichkeiten verzichten? Harry G. Frankfurts Kritik am Prinzip der alternativen Möglichkeiten (PAP). In: Zeitschrift für philosophische Forschung (ZphF), Heft 4.
Frankfurt, Harry. "Alternate Possibilities and Moral Responsibility". In Reason & Responsibility: Readings in Some Basic Problems of Philosophy, edited by Joel Feinberg and Russ Shafer-Landau, 486–492. California: Thomson Wadsworth, 2008.

External links 

 Princeton Faculty Listing
 2007 Harry Frankfurt Video Feature Interview on The Alcove with Mark Molaro

1929 births
20th-century American non-fiction writers
20th-century American philosophers
20th-century essayists
21st-century American non-fiction writers
21st-century American philosophers
21st-century essayists
Action theorists
American ethicists
American male essayists
American male non-fiction writers
American philosophy academics
Analytic philosophers
Epistemologists
Free will
Johns Hopkins University alumni
Living people
Metaphysicians
Ontologists
Philosophers of culture
Philosophers of history
Philosophers of love
Philosophers of mind
Philosophers of social science
Philosophy writers
Princeton University faculty
Rationalists
Rockefeller University faculty
Yale University faculty
20th-century American male writers
21st-century American male writers